GNUstepWeb is a development environment and an application server for Web Applications. It is characterized by strict separation of data storage, processing and user interface development.

GNUstepWeb is based on GNUstep. Its goals are to be compatible to WebObjects version 4.5.x with some extensions.
Apple's WebObjects was ported to   Java with version 5. GNUstepWeb continues using Objective-C.

External links 

 GNUstep.org - homepage
 GNUstepWiki - homepage of GNUstep wiki
 lists.turbocat.net/mailman/listinfo.cgi/gswhackers  – developer mailing list.

Servers (computing)
NeXT
Software that uses GNUstep